The Garo Hills (Pron: ˈgɑ:rəʊ) are part of the Garo-Khasi range in Meghalaya, India.  They are inhabited by the Garo people.  It is one of the wettest places in the world. The range is part of the Meghalaya subtropical forests ecoregion.

Demographics
Garo Hills was a single district of British India. The region now comprises five districts. It has a total population of 1,103,542. Tura is the largest town with a population of about 74,858 located at the foothills of often cloud covered Tura peak. The town is centrally located to other popular game and wildlife sanctuaries in the district such as the national parks of Balphakram and Nokrek, and several natural limestone caves (the Siju Cave is among the longest in Asia). These places are rich reserves of natural flora and fauna and a refuge for endangered animals.

Religion

Languages

Society
The traditional Garo female dress is a piece of cloth around the waist and a blouse or vest. The men usually wear, in addition to cloth, a turban. Males and females both wear bangles and earrings. The staple cereal food is rice. They also eat millet, maize, tapioca etc. Garos are very liberal in their food habits. Practically all available types of meat and animals are eaten. The liquor is not distilled, but prepared by brewing food grains.

The society is matrilineal like the Khasis and the Jaintias. Till death, the newborn baby belongs to the mother's family, irrespective of sex, even after marriage. Marriage within the clan is completely prohibited and severely punishable for both the Khasis and the Garos. Till now, the institution of Bachelors dormitories which is gradually disappearing amongst the tribes of northeastern region, are found in the Garo villages. In such dormitories young people stay and live together till they are married. They receive various training in the dormitories like making various A'chik music instruments, wrestling or traditional sports, making of traditional bamboo baskets. This institution is similar to ancient agoges of Sparta. The Khasis and Garos are now mostly Christians. Before that they were nature-worshippers.

Garo Hills known for its abundance of wildlife attracts naturalists and photographers to capture the multifaceted sights of a unique range of flora and fauna. Two mountain ranges - the Arabella range and the Tura range, pass through the Garo Hills, forming the great Balpakram valley in between. The headquarters town of Tura is 323 km from the state capital Shillong via Guwahati, at an altitude of 657 m. The highest point in the Garo Hills is Nokrek Peak with elevation of 1412 m.

Tura has a picturesque landscape of hills against a backdrop of low-lying plains. A sunset view can be best seen from Tura Peak at 1,400 m and its summit can be reached by a 5 km trek, partly by hiking and also by rock-climbing.

Places of interest
These are locations in and around Garo Hills which are tourist spots. These include:

Nokrek Peak: The highest point of the Garo Hills region of the State, Nokrek Peak stands 1412 metres above sea level. The mother germoplasm of Citrus-indica have been discovered by science researchers within Nokrek Range. This discovery led to the establishment of the National CitrusGene Sanctuary-cum-Biosphere Reserve at Nokrek covering an area of 47 square kilometres.
Tura Peak: A hill stands on the eastern flank of Tura, the largest town in the Garo Hills region of the state. It peaks 872 metres above sea level. 
Imilchang Dare: This waterfall is located close to Asakgre village in South Garo Hills district. The deep, wide pool at the bottom of the fall with its wide and expansive surroundings make it an exciting swimming pool, full of fish of varied size and colour.
Balpakram: A National Wildlife Park, located in South Garo Hills and 167 km from Tura. It is home to the rare Lesser Panda, the Indian bison and the stag like Serow. A variety of medicinal herbs locally called "dikges" grow abundantly in Balpakram.
Napak Lake: Located at a distance of 112 km from Tura, ideal for fishing and bird watching with the river Simsang flowing nearby. 
Siju Caves: The famous limestone caves of Siju are located near Simsang River in Siju village.
• Wari Chora: Located in South Garo Hills about 35 km from Baghmara Town. This place is known for lofty canyons which mesmerizes any visitor with the charm of the river flowing underneath it and waterfalls dripping continuously. It is a coveted place and its not on google map. It takes hours of trekking from Dabalgre village.

See also
 West Garo Hills district
 North Garo Hills
 Resubelpara
 Khasi Hills
 Patkai

References

External links 

Mountains of Meghalaya
Tourism in Northeast India